Charles Gunning may refer to:

Charles Gunning (actor), who appeared in The Haunting (1999 film)
Sir Charles Vere Gunning, 7th Baronet (1859–1950) of the Gunning baronets
Sir Charles Theodore Gunning, 9th Baronet (b. 1935) of the Gunning baronets